Tours is one of the largest cities in the region of Centre-Val de Loire, France. It is the prefecture of the department of Indre-et-Loire. The commune of Tours had 136,463 inhabitants as of 2018 while the population of the whole metropolitan area was 516,973.

Tours sits on the lower reaches of the Loire, between Orléans and the Atlantic coast. Formerly named Caesarodunum by its founder, Roman Emperor Augustus, it possesses one of the largest amphitheaters of the Roman Empire, the Tours Amphitheatre. Known for the Battle of Tours in 732 AD, it is a National Sanctuary with connections to the Merovingians and the Carolingians, with the Capetians making the kingdom's currency the Livre tournois. Saint Martin, Gregory of Tours and Alcuin were all from Tours. Tours was once part of Touraine, a former province of France. Tours was the first city of the silk industry. It was wanted by Louis XI, royal capital under the Valois Kings with its Loire castles and city of art with the School of Tours. The prefecture was partially destroyed during the French Wars of Religion in the late 18th century, and again in June 1940.

The White and Blue city keeps a historical center registered in the UNESCO, and is home to the Vieux-Tours, a patrimonial site. The garden city has a green heritage and an urban landscape strongly influenced by its natural space. The historic city that is nicknamed "Le Petit Paris" and its region by its history and culture has always been a land of birth or host to many personalities, international sporting events, and is a university city with more than 30,000 students in 2019. Tours is a popular culinary city with specialties such as: rillettes, rillons, Touraine vineyards, AOC Sainte-Maure-de-Touraine cheeses and nougats. The city is also the end-point of the annual Paris–Tours cycle race.

Etymology 
A popular folk etymology of the word "Tours" is that it comes from Turonus, the nephew of Brutus. Turonus died in a war between Corineus and the king of Aquitaine, Goffarius Pictus, provoked by Corineus hunting in the king's forests without permission. It is said that Turonus was buried in Tours and the city is founded around his grave.

History

In Gallic times, Tours was an important crossing point over the river Loire. It became part of the Roman Empire during the 1st century AD, and the city was named "" ("hill of Caesar"). The name evolved in the 4th century when the original Gallic name, Turones, became "Civitas Turonum", and then "Tours". It was at this time that the Tours Amphitheatre was built.

Tours became a metropolis in the Roman province of Lugdunum towards 380–388 AD, dominating Maine, Brittany, and the Loire Valley. One important figure in the city was Saint Martin of Tours, a bishop who shared his coat with a naked beggar in Amiens. The importance of Martin in the medieval Christian West made Tours, and its position on the route of pilgrimage to Santiago de Compostela, a major centre during the Middle Ages.

Middle Ages
In the 6th century Gregory of Tours, author of the Ten Books of History, restored a cathedral destroyed by a fire in 561. Saint Martin's monastery benefited from its inception, at the very start of the 6th century from patronage and support from the Frankish king, Clovis I, which increased considerably the influence of the saint, the abbey and the city in Gaul. In the 9th century, Tours was at the heart of the Carolingian Rebirth, in particular because of Alcuin, an abbot of Marmoutier Abbey.

This ignited the Battle of Tours. The Muslim army was defeated, preventing an Islamic conquest of France.

In 845, Tours repelled the first attack of the Viking chief Haesten. In 850, the Vikings settled at the mouths of the Seine and the Loire. Still led by Haesten, they went up the Loire again in 852 and sacked Angers, Tours and Marmoutier Abbey.

During the Middle Ages, Tours consisted of two juxtaposed and competing centres. The "City" in the east, successor of the late Roman 'castrum', was composed of the cathedral and palace of the archbishops as well as the castle of Tours. The castle of Tours acted as a seat of the authority of the Counts of Tours (later Counts of Anjou) and the King of France. In the west, the "new city" structured around the Abbey of Saint Martin was freed from the control of the city during the 10th century (an enclosure was built towards 918) and became "Châteauneuf". This space, organized between Saint Martin and the Loire, became the economic centre of Tours. Between these two centres were Varennes, vineyards and fields, little occupied except for the Abbaye Saint-Julien established on the banks of the Loire. The two centres were linked during the 14th century.

Tours became the capital of the county of Tours or Touraine, a territory bitterly disputed between the counts of Blois and Anjou – the latter were victorious in the 11th century. It was the capital of France at the time of Louis XI, who had settled in the castle of Montils (today the castle of Plessis in La Riche). Tours and Touraine remained a permanent residence of the kings and court until the 16th century. The rebirth gave Tours and Touraine many private mansions and castles, joined to some extent under the generic name of the Châteaux of the Loire. It is also at the time of Louis XI that the silk industry was introduced – despite difficulties, the industry still survives to this day.

16th–18th centuries
Charles IX passed through the city at the time of his royal tour of France between 1564 and 1566, accompanied by the Court and various noblemen: his brother the Duke of Anjou, Henri de Navarre, the cardinals of Bourbon and Lorraine. At this time, the Catholics returned to power in Angers: the attendant assumed the right to nominate the aldermen. The Massacre of Saint-Barthelemy was not repeated at Tours. The Protestants were imprisoned by the aldermen – a measure which prevented their extermination. The permanent return of the Court to Paris and then Versailles marked the beginning of a slow but permanent decline. Guillaume the Metayer (1763–1798), known as Rochambeau, the well known counter-revolutionary chief of Mayenne, was shot in Tours.

19th–20th centuries
The arrival of the railway in the 19th century saved the city by making it an important nodal point. The main railway station is known as Tours-Saint-Pierre-des-Corps. At that time, Tours was expanding towards the south into a district known as the Prébendes. The importance of the city as a centre of communications contributed to its revival and, as the 20th century progressed, Tours became a dynamic conurbation, economically oriented towards the service sector.

First World War

The city was greatly affected by the First World War. A force of 25,000 American soldiers arrived in 1917, setting up textile factories for the manufacture of uniforms, repair shops for military equipment, munitions dumps, an army post office and an American military hospital at Augustins. Because of this, Tours became a garrison town with a resident general staff. The American presence is remembered today by the Woodrow Wilson bridge over the Loire, which was officially opened in July 1918 and bears the name of the President of the United States from 1913 to 1921. Three American air force squadrons, including the 492nd, were based at the Parçay-Meslay airfield, their personnel playing an active part in the life of the city. Americans paraded at funerals and award ceremonies for the Croix de Guerre; they also took part in festivals and their YMCA organised shows for the troops. Some men married women from Tours.

Inter-war years
In 1920, the city hosted the Congress of Tours, which saw the creation of the French Communist Party.

Second World War
Tours was also marked by the Second World War as the city suffered massive destruction in 1940. For four years it was a city of military camps and fortifications. From 10 to 13 June 1940, Tours was the temporary seat of the French government before its move to Bordeaux.

German incendiary bombs caused a huge fire which blazed out of control from 20 to 22 June and destroyed part of the city centre. Some architectural masterpieces of the 16th and 17th centuries were lost, as was the monumental entry to the city. The Wilson Bridge that carried a water main which supplied the city was dynamited to slow the progress of the German advance. With the water main severed, nobody was able to extinguish the inferno, therefore inhabitants had no option but to flee to safety. More heavy air raids by Allied forces devastated the area around the railway station in 1944, causing several hundred deaths.

Post-war developments
A plan for the rebuilding of the downtown area drawn up by the local architect Camille Lefèvre was adopted even before the end of the war. The plan was for 20 small quadrangular blocks of housing to be arranged around the main road (la rue Nationale), which was widened. This regular layout attempted to echo, yet simplify, the 18th-century architecture. Pierre Patout succeeded Lefèvre as the architect in charge of rebuilding in 1945. At one time there was talk of demolishing the southern side of the rue Nationale in order to make it in keeping with the new development.

The recent history of Tours is marked by the personality of Jean Royer, who was Mayor for 36 years and helped save the old town from demolition by establishing one of the first Conservation Areas. This example of conservation policy would later inspire the Malraux Law for the safeguarding of historic city centres. In the 1970s, Jean Royer also extended the city to the south by diverting the course of the river Cher to create the districts of Rives du Cher and des Fontaines. At the time, this was one of the largest urban developments in Europe. In 1970, the François Rabelais University was founded; this is centred on the bank of the Loire in the downtown area, and not – as it was then the current practice – in a campus in the suburbs. The latter solution was also chosen by the twin university of Orleans. Royer's long term as Mayor was, however, not without controversy, as exemplified by the construction of the practical – but aesthetically unattractive – motorway which runs along the bed of a former canal just  from the cathedral. Another bone of contention was the original Vinci Congress Centre by Jean Nouvel. This project incurred debts although it did, at least, make Tours one of France's principal conference centres.

Jean Germain, a member of the Socialist Party, became Mayor in 1995 and made debt reduction his priority. Ten years later, his economic management was regarded as much wiser than that of his predecessor due to the financial stability of the city returning. However, the achievements of Jean Germain were criticized by the municipal opposition for a lack of ambition. There were no large building projects instituted under his double mandate. This position is disputed by those in power, who affirm their policy of concentrating on the quality of life, as evidenced by urban restoration, the development of public transport and cultural activities.

Climate
Tours has an oceanic climate that is very mild for such a northern latitude.

Sights

Tours Cathedral

The cathedral of Tours, dedicated to Saint Gatien, its canonized first bishop, was begun about 1170 to replace the cathedral that was burnt out in 1166 during the dispute between Louis VII of France and Henry II of England. The lowermost stages of the western towers belong to the 12th century, but the rest of the west end is in the profusely detailed Flamboyant Gothic of the 15th century, completed just as the Renaissance was affecting the patrons who planned the châteaux of Touraine. These towers were being constructed at the same time as, for example, the Château de Chenonceau.

When the 15th-century illuminator Jean Fouquet was set the task of illuminating Josephus's Jewish Antiquities, his depiction of Solomon's Temple was modeled on the nearly-complete cathedral of Tours. The atmosphere of the Gothic cathedral close permeates Honoré de Balzac's dark short novel of jealousy and provincial intrigues, Le Curé de Tours (The Curate of Tours), and his medieval story Maître Cornélius opens in the cathedral itself.

Other points of interest
 Hôtel de Ville
 Jardin botanique de Tours, the municipal botanical garden
 Musée des Beaux-Arts de Tours
 Hôtel Goüin
 Château de Tours
 Basilique St-Martin
Place Plumereau, the old town
Grand Théâtre, housing the Opéra de Tours
Tour Charlemagne

Language

Before the French Revolution, the inhabitants of Tours (Les Tourangeaux) were known for speaking the "purest" form of French in the entire country. The pronunciation of Touraine was traditionally regarded as the most standard pronunciation of the French language, until the 19th century when the standard pronunciation of French shifted to that of the Parisian bourgeoisie. This is explained by the fact that the court of France was living in Touraine between 1430 and 1530. French, the language of the court, had become the official language of the entire kingdom.

A Council of Tours in 813 decided that priests should preach sermons in different languages because the common people could no longer understand classical Latin. This was the first official recognition of an early French language distinct from Latin, and can be considered as the birth of French.

The ordinance of Montils-lès-Tours, promulgated by Charles VII in 1454, made it mandatory to write laws and oral customs in the native language of the area.

An ordinance of Charles VIII (born in Amboise, near Tours) in 1490 and one of Louis XII (born in Blois, near Tours) in 1510 broaden the scope of the ordinance of Charles VII.

Finally the ordinance of Villers-Cotterêts, signed into law by Francis I in 1539, called for the use of French in all legal acts, notarized contracts and official legislation to avoid any linguistic confusion.

Gregory of Tours wrote in the 6th century that some people in this area could still speak Gaulish.

City

The city of Tours has a population of 140,000 and is called "Le Jardin de la France" ("The Garden of France"). There are several parks located within the city. Tours is located between two rivers, the Loire to the north and the Cher to the south. The buildings of Tours are white with blue slate (called Ardoise) roofs; this style is common in the north of France, while most buildings in the south of France have terracotta roofs.

Tours is famous for its original medieval district, called le Vieux Tours. Unique to the Old City are its preserved half-timbered buildings and la Place Plumereau, a square with busy pubs and restaurants, whose open-air tables fill the centre of the square. The Boulevard Beranger crosses the Rue Nationale at the Place Jean-Jaures and is the location of weekly markets and fairs.

Tours is famous for its many bridges crossing the river Loire. One of them, the Pont Wilson, collapsed in 1978, but was rebuilt.

In the garden of the ancient Palais des Archevêques (now Musée des Beaux-Arts) is a huge cedar tree said to have been planted by Napoleon. The garden also has a stuffed elephant named Fritz. He escaped from the Barnum and Bailey circus during their stay in Tours in 1902. He went mad and had to be shot down, but the city paid to honor him, and he was taxidermied as a result.

Tours is home to University of Tours (formerly known as University François Rabelais of Tours), the site of one of the most important choral competitions, called Florilège Vocal de Tours International Choir Competition, and is a member city of the European Grand Prix for Choral Singing.

Population

The population data in the table and graph below refer to the commune of Tours proper, in its geography at the given years. The commune of Tours absorbed the former commune of Saint-Étienne in 1845 and Sainte-Radegonde-en-Touraine and Saint-Symphorien in 1964.

Transportation

Today, with extensive rail (including TGV) and autoroute connections linking to the rest of the country, Tours is a jumping-off point for tourist visits to the Loire Valley and the royal châteaux.

Tours is on one of the main lines of the TGV. It is possible to travel to the west coast of Bordeaux in two and a half hours. From there, the line follows the Mediterranean coast via Avignon, and then to Spain and Barcelona. There are also lines to Lyon, Strasbourg and Lille. It takes less than one hour by train to get from Tours to Paris by TGV and one and a half hours to get to Charles de Gaulle Airport. Tours has two main stations: Gare de Tours, the central station, and Gare de Saint-Pierre-des-Corps, used by trains that do not terminate in Tours.

Tours Loire Valley Airport connects the Loire Valley to European cities.

Tours has a tram system, which began service at the end of August 2013. Twenty-one Alstom Citadis trams were ordered.

There is also a bus service, the main central stop being Jean Jaures, next to the Hôtel de Ville, and rue Nationale, the high street of Tours. The tram and bus networks are operated by Fil Bleu and they share a ticketing system. A second tram line is scheduled for 2025.

Sport
The city's football team, Tours FC, currently play in Championnat National 3, the fifth level of French football. They also have a second team, CCSP Tours. CCSP's home stadium is the Stade des Tourettes and they play in the Division d'Honneur Regionale de Centre, the seventh tier of the French football league system.

Tours has served as the finish location for Paris–Tours, a one-day road cycling classic race held almost every October since 1896.

Tours also has a volleyball club named the Tours VB.

Catholics from Tours

Tours is a special place for Catholics who follow the devotion to the Holy Face of Jesus and the adoration of the Blessed Sacrament. In 1843, Sister Marie of St Peter of Tours reported a vision which started the devotion to the Holy Face of Jesus, in reparation for the many insults Christ suffered in His Passion. The Golden Arrow Prayer was first made public by her.

The Venerable Leo Dupont also known as The Holy Man of Tours lived in Tours at about the same time. In 1849 he started the nightly adoration of the Blessed Sacrament, which spread throughout France. Upon hearing of Sister Marie of St Peter's reported visions, he started to burn a vigil lamp continuously before a picture of the Holy Face of Jesus. The devotion was eventually approved by Pope Pius XII in 1958 and he formally declared the Feast of the Holy Face of Jesus as Shrove Tuesday (the Tuesday before Ash Wednesday) for all Roman Catholics. The Oratory of the Holy Face on Rue St. Etienne in Tours receives many pilgrims every year.

Tours was the site of the episcopal activity of St. Martin of Tours and has further Christian connotations in that the pivotal Battle of Tours in 732 is often considered the very first decisive victory over the invading Islamic forces, turning the tide against them. The battle also helped lay the foundations of the Carolingian Empire.

Notable people

Public service 
Berengarius of Tours (999–1088), theologian.
William Firmatus (1026–1103), a Norman hermit, pilgrim and now a saint
Bernard of Tours (fl. 1147, d. before 1178), philosopher and poet
Jeanne-Marie de Maille (1331–1414), saint
Charles of Valois (1446–1472), son of Charles VII of France, younger brother of King Louis XI
Louise de la Vallière (1644–1710), noblewoman and courtesan.
André-Michel Guerry (1802–1866), lawyer and statistician
Marie of St Peter (1816–1848), mystic carmelite nun
Régis de Trobriand (1816–1897), American military officer and author
Paul Viollet (1840–1914), historian.
Louis Rimbault (1877–1949), individualist anarchist, promoted of simple living and veganism.
Emile B. De Sauzé (1878–1964), language educator
 Baron Geoffroy Chodron de Courcel (1912-1992), nobleman, soldier and diplomat.
René Laurentin (1917–2017), theologian, student of Mariology
Jean Royer (1920–2011), former Minister and former Mayor of Tours.
Philippe Lacoue-Labarthe (1940–2007), philosopher, literary critic and translator 
 Jean-Louis Bruguière (born 1943), top French investigating judge
Serge Babary (born 1946) politician, Mayor of Tours between 2014 and 2017 
Dominique Bussereau (born 1952), politician
Catherine Colonna (born 1956) a French diplomat and politician

The Arts 

Jean Fouquet (1420–1481), painter and miniaturist.
Juste de Juste (ca.1505 – ca.1559), Franco-Italian sculptor and printmaker in etching
François Clouet (ca.1510 – 1572), French Renaissance miniaturist and painter.
Abraham Bosse (1604–1676), artist as a printmaker in etching, but also in watercolour.
François de Paule Bretonneau (1660–1741), preacher, librettist and playwright.
Philippe Néricault Destouches (1680–1754), dramatist and playwright.
Louis Dutens (1730–1812), writer, lived most of his life in Britain.
Jean Baudrais (1749–1832), writer and magistrate.
Jean-Nicolas Bouilly (1763–1842), playwright and librettist.
Philippe Musard (1792–1859), conductor and composer
Honoré de Balzac (1799–1850), novelist and playwright.
Jules Moinaux (1815–1895), writer, playwright and librettist.
Louisa Emily Dobrée (ca.1852–1917), writer of novels, short stories and juvenile literature
Georges Courteline (1858–1929), dramatist and novelist
Daniel Mendaille (1885–1963), stage and film actor
Paul Nizan (1905–1940), novelist and philosopher
Yves Bonnefoy (1923–2016), poet and art historian. 
Paul Guers (1927–2016), film actor
Jean-Claude Narcy (born 1938), journalist and news anchor on TF1
Jean Chalopin (born 1950), TV and movie producer, director and writer
Jacques Villeret (1951–2005), actor 
Yves Ker Ambrun (born 1954), cartoonist and graphic artist; known as YKA 
Laurent Petitguillaume (born 1960), radio and television host
Luc Delahaye (born 1962), photographer of large-scale color works about social issues
Stéphane Audeguy (born 1964), writer, literary critic and teacher
Laurent Mauvignier (born 1967), writer of prose and for the theatre
Mathieu Blanc-Francard (born 1970), musician and singer-songwriter, stage name Sinclair.
Nadia Zighem (born 1973), a R&B singer, stage name Nâdiya
Harry Roselmack (born 1973), television presenter
Delphine Bardin (born 1974), classical pianist
Isabelle Geffroy (born 1980), singer who mixes jazzy styles, stage name Zaz
Gabriel Piotrowski (born 1988), reggae singer, producer and writer, stage name Biga Ranx

Science and business 

Guillaume Rouillé (ca.1518 – 1589), prominent humanist bookseller-printer
Julien Le Roy (1686-1759), clockmaker and watchmaker.
Nicolas Heurteloup (1750–1812), a military physician and surgeon.
Alexandre Goüin (1792–1872), banker and politician; linked with Hôtel Goüin
Gabriel Lamé (1795–1870), mathematician, worked on  partial differential equations
Félix Dujardin (1801–1860), biologist, researched protozoans
Armand Trousseau (1801–1867), internist; found Trousseau sign of malignancy
Théophile Archambault (1806–1863), psychiatrist, also taught mental pathology
Ernest Goüin (1815–1885), civil engineer and industrialist.
Eugène Goüin (1818–1909), banker and politician.
Jules Haime (1824–1856), geologist, paleontologist and zoologist; researched coral.
Émile Delahaye (1843–1905), automobile pioneer, founded Delahaye an automobile manufacturer
Maurice Couette (1858–1943), physicist, studied of fluidity & rheology

Sport 

Mervin Glennie (1918—1986) English first-class cricketer
Catherine Poirot (born 1963) former breaststroke swimmer, bronze medallist in the 1984 Summer Olympics
Pascal Hervé (born 1964), a road racing cyclist.
Xavier Gravelaine (born 1968), former footballer with 405 club caps and 4 for France
Maamar Mamouni (born 1976) a former footballer with over 290 club caps and 29 for Algeria
Laurent Mekies (born 1977), assistant team principal and race director for Scuderia Ferrari
Ludovic Roy (born 1977), footballer with 234 club caps (all in Scotland)
Frédéric Dambier (born 1977), figure skater, landed a quadruple salchow in competition.
Luc Ducalcon (born 1984), rugby union player with over 250 club caps and 17 for France
Josselin Ouanna (born 1986) a retired French tennis player.
Abdou Diallo (born 1996), footballer with over 150 club caps and 22 for Senegal

Twin towns — sister cities
Tours is twinned with:

Mülheim, Germany, since 1962
Segovia, Spain, since 1972
Parma, Italy, since 1976
Luoyang, China, since 1982
Trois-Rivières, Canada, since 1987
Takamatsu, Japan, since 1988
Brașov, Romania, since 1990
Minneapolis, Minnesota USA, since 1991

Gallery

See also

 Bishop of Tours
 The Turonian epoch, named for the city of Tours
 Listing of the work of Jean Antoine Injalbert, sculptor of Tours railway station
Marcel Gaumont, sculptor of war memorial

References

Further reading

External links

  
 Official tourism information about Tours, on the Departemental Tourism Board website

 
Communes of Indre-et-Loire
Prefectures in France
Gallia Lugdunensis
Touraine
 
Cities in France